The Porsche 356/1 was the first real car created by Ferdinand "Ferry" Porsche. This prototype car was a two-seater open roadster with a mid-mounted, air-cooled flat-4 engine of 1,131 cc displacement that produced . While the body was an original design, most of the mechanicals (including engine and suspension) were derived from the Volkswagen Beetle which Ferry's father, Ferdinand Porsche, had designed. 

The aluminum roadster body of the 356/1 was designed by Porsche employee Erwin Komenda in April 1948 at Gmünd and completed only a month later. Smooth and low, the 356/1 set the pattern for later 356s with one fundamental difference; the engine of the production cars was moved behind the rear axle (to reduce costs and make room for two additional seats). The car was registered by the state of Carinthia (Kärnten) with the license plate K45-286 and made its maiden voyage on June 8, 1948.

Only one 356/1 was made and it is on display at the Porsche Museum, Stuttgart.

See also 
Porsche Salzburg (the company that made Porsche 356/1)

External links 

How Stuff Works: Porsche 356 Prototypes

356 1
Sports cars